Newcastle West was an electoral district of the Legislative Assembly in the Australian state of New South Wales. It was originally created in 1894, when multi-member districts were abolished, and the three member district of Newcastle was divided between Newcastle West, Newcastle East, Kahibah, Waratah and Wickham. It was abolished in 1904 as a result of the 1903 New South Wales referendum, which required the number of members of the Legislative Assembly to be reduced from 125 to 90. Parts of Newcastle West were absorbed into the districts of Wickham, Newcastle and Kahibah.

Members for Newcastle West

Election results

References

Former electoral districts of New South Wales
Constituencies established in 1894
1894 establishments in Australia
Constituencies disestablished in 1904
1904 disestablishments in Australia